is a later, more political, pink film directed by Kōji Wakamatsu.

Plot summary
The movie focuses on the actions of a revolutionary movement. One faction, with a leader  called October, breaks into a US weapons depot and takes cases of hand bombs. While escaping, several soldiers are killed and  October is blinded by the blast from a mishandled case of bombs. The movement's highest authority deems October unfit and sends Winter's February, leader of another faction, to take October's remaining bombs through any means necessary.  This causes October and his soldiers to undergo a shift in their approach.  One by one, the members start to take matters into their own hands.

References
Totaro, Donato Koji Wakamatsu's Ecstasy of Angels(English) Hors Champ Retrieved on 2008-2-19
mongip Ecstasy of the Angels (Wakamatsu Koji 1972)(English) Sarudama Retrieved on 2008-2-19

External links 
 

1972 films
Films directed by Kōji Wakamatsu
Pink films
1970s pornographic films
1970s Japanese films